Agincourt was a merchant vessel launched at North Shields in 1804. She was a transport and later sailed between Britain and Quebec. Her crew abandoned her at sea in 1821.

Career
Although she was launched in 1804, Agincourt first appeared in a register, the Register of Shipping, in 1805. Her master was Crawford, her owner F. Hurry, and her trade Shields–London.

On 14 February 1806 Lloyd's List reported that Agincourt, Sandwell, master, had run ashore in the Shannon while sailing from Tortola to London. A few days later it was reported that she had been gotten off.

On 19 January 1808 Lloyd's List reported that the transports Agnes and Agincourt, from the River Plate, had been driven ashore at Cowes, on 14 January 1808.

On 4 October 1819 Agincourt, Mathwin, master, put into Milford Haven. She had been sailing from Quebec to London when she developed a leak that resulted in her talking on 18 inches of water an hour. She was going to discharge her cargo so that she could be grounded and examined to determine the damage she had sustained.

Loss
Agincourt, Everard, master, sailed from Quebec City to London on 7 October 1821. She was found abandoned and waterlogged on 12 November.

Her crew had abandoned Agincourt in the Atlantic Ocean at  after she developed a  leak and 14 feet of water had accumulated in her hold. St Vincent rescued Agincourts 13 crew members from their boats on 8 November. St Vincent was on her way from Glasgow to Grenada and transferred the seamen to several vessels sailing eastwards. Juno, Casengina, master, sailing from Montevideo, delivered Captain Everard and three of his crew to Gibraltar on 10 December.

Citations and references
Citations

References

1804 ships
Ships built in England
Age of Sail merchant ships of England
Maritime incidents in 1806
Maritime incidents in 1808
Maritime incidents in November 1821
Shipwrecks in the Atlantic Ocean
Shipwrecks in the English Channel
Shipwrecks of Ireland
Shipwrecks in rivers